Qutub-E-Kripa is a national award-winning ensemble of young musicians of A. R. Rahman's KM Music Conservatory. According to AR Rahman's official website, the K M College of Music & Technology produces outstandingly talented students every year. In order to provide direction and a means to showcase their talent, Qutub E Kripa was formed by AR Rahman. 

They have been co-credited alongside A. R. Rahman for the background scores of films such as 24, O Kadhal Kanmani, Tamasha, OK Jaanu, Kaatru Veliyidai, Mom, Chekka Chivantha Vaanam, Sarkar and 2.0. They have also scored for the Netflix show, Daughters of Destiny.

In 2018, Academy Awards shortlisted Qutub-E-Kripa's three songs "I’ll be Gone", "Have you Ever Wondered" and "We’ll Party All Night" from Raj Thiruselvan-directed film Lake of Fire for the Best Original Song.

Filmography
 Lake of Fire
 Everest (2014)
 O Kadhal Kanmani (2015)
 24 (2016)
 Cinema Veeran (2017)
 Kaatru Veliyidai (2017)
 Daughters of Destiny (2017)
 Mom (2017)
 Mersal (2017)
 Chekka Chivvantha Vaanam (2018)
 Sarkar (2018)
 2.0 (2018)
 Le Musk (2019)
 Sarvam Thaala Mayam (2019)
 Bigil (2019)
 Shikara (2020)
 College Kumar (2020)
 Cobra (2022)
 Ponniyin Selvan (2022)
 Venthu Thaninthathu Kaadu (2022)

References

Indian musical groups